Jonathan Kings was the Administrator of Tokelau from 2011 to 2015, and from 2017 to 2018.

He joined the New Zealand Ministry of Foreign Affairs and Trade in 2010, and is currently the Deputy Secretary of the Pacific  and Development Group.

References

Living people
Administrators of Tokelau
New Zealand diplomats
Year of birth missing (living people)